Jean Walker may refer to:
 Jean Nellie Miles Walker, Australian army nurse
 E. Jean Walker, American academic